Jáderson Flores dos Reis (born 12 August 2000), simply known as Jáderson, is a Brazilian footballer who plays as a left-back for Sport, on loan from Athletico Paranaense, he also can play as a left-midfielder and a left-winger.

Career statistics

References

External links
Athletico official profile 

2000 births
Living people
Footballers from Porto Alegre
Brazilian footballers
Association football forwards
Campeonato Brasileiro Série A players
Campeonato Brasileiro Série B players
Campeonato Brasileiro Série C players
Esporte Clube Cruzeiro players
Club Athletico Paranaense players
Santa Cruz Futebol Clube players
Sport Club do Recife players